Ricarda Raquel Barbosa Lima (born September 12, 1970) is a Brazilian female volleyball player. She competed for Brazil at the 2000 Summer Olympics in Sydney, Australia, where, she won the bronze medal with the Women's National Team. She competed at the 1999 FIVB Volleyball Women's World Cup.

Clubs
  Leites Nestlé (1995–1997)
  BCN/Osasco (2000–2001)
  Brasil Telecom/Força Olímpica (2003–2004)
  Rexona/Ades (2004–2005)

Awards

Individuals
 1998–99 Brazilian Superliga – "Best Receiver" 
 1999 FIVB World Grand Prix – "Best Digger"
 2000 Summer Olympics – "Best Digger"
 2000–01 Brazilian Superliga – "Best Libero"

References

  UOL Profile

1970 births
Living people
Brazilian women's volleyball players
Volleyball players at the 2000 Summer Olympics
Olympic volleyball players of Brazil
Olympic bronze medalists for Brazil
Olympic medalists in volleyball
Medalists at the 2000 Summer Olympics
Sportspeople from Federal District (Brazil)